AFSOUTH can refer to:
 Air Forces Southern, or Twelfth Air Force, the air force component of United States Southern Command
 Allied Joint Force Command Naples, previously Allied Forces Southern Europe, where southern European NATO operations are directed from